Nori Gopala Krishna Murti (10 February 1910 – 24 February 1995) was an Indian civil engineer, known for his contributions for the implementation of Koyna Hydroelectric Project. He was the chairman of Bhakra Dam Management Board and the vice-chairman of the International Congress on Large Dams. The Government of India awarded him the Padma Shri, the fourth highest civilian award, in 1963. He received the Padma Bhushan, the third highest civilian award, in 1972.

Biography

Krishna Murti was born on 16 February 1910 at Bapatla in the south Indian state of Andhra Pradesh to  Venkateswarlu Nori–Sundaramma couple and did his early education at Bapatla Board School. As a civil engineer in the Government service, he was involved in the development of a number of dams and airports in India. The most notable among his achievements was the designing, implementation and commissioning of Koyna Hydroelectric Project. He also served as the chairman of the Bhakranangal Dam Management Board and was the vice-chairman of the International Congress on Large Dams (ICLD) from 1969 to 1972.

Murti, who was married to Sundararamaratnam, died in 1995, at the age 85. Nori Pandurang Vithal, erstwhile chief commissioner of railway safety of the Indian Railways and Vasudev Nori, both civil engineers, were his sons.

Awards and honors 
Krishna Murti received the Padma Shri, the fourth highest civilian award from the Government of India in 1963. The Government honored him again in 1972 with the third highest award of the Padma Bhushan.

See also

 Hydroelectric power in India
 List of conventional hydroelectric power stations

References

External links
 

1910 births
1995 deaths
Recipients of the Padma Bhushan in civil service
Indian civil engineers
People from Andhra Pradesh
Recipients of the Padma Shri in civil service